The Molson Canadian Theatre in Coquitlam, British Columbia is a 1,074-seat live event theatre adjoining the Hard Rock Casino Vancouver. The $20 million venue opened with a show by Little Richard on September 16, 2006, and was named for local radio legend Red Robinson. It was originally called The Red Robinson Show Theatre and later The Theatre, but was changed to its current name in April 2016 due to brand sponsorship.

A wide variety of acts have appeared at the theatre, including singers (Tony Bennett, Jewel, Paul Anka, and Chris Cornell), pop/rock groups (Barenaked Ladies, The Beach Boys, Chris Cornell, Judas Priest), comedians (Dennis Miller, Jay Leno, Howie Mandel, Bill Maher), country acts (Kenny Rogers, Randy Travis, Wynonna), and Broadway-type shows (Cats).

Seating
The  multi-purpose venue is the largest theatre in the world to use the spiral lift system which allows independent row configurations. There are four configurations possible:
 Standard Theatre
 Rock Concert
 Cabaret
 Cabaret with Dance Floor

The television series Psych filmed a concert scene at the theatre on April 24, 2007.

References

External links
The Molson Canadian Theatre at Hard Rock Casino Vancouver

Buildings and structures in Coquitlam
Culture of Coquitlam
Music venues in British Columbia
Theatres in British Columbia
Tourism in British Columbia
Music venues completed in 2006
2006 establishments in British Columbia